Battambang Provincial Museum is a museum in Kamkor village, Svay Por commune, Battambang Province, western Cambodia. It was established in 1963 by Madeleine Giteau. It houses a notable pre and Angkorian collection of pottery, statuary, and musical instruments.

References

Museums in Cambodia
Buildings and structures in Battambang province
Museums established in 1963
Tourist attractions in Battambang province